The 2011 season of the State League Premier Division ran from 26 February to 2 October, featuring 12 clubs.

Balcatta were the Premiers – their first title – and Perth were Champions.

Pre-season changes

League table

Finals

References 

Soccer in Western Australia
2011 in Australian soccer
2011